General Anderson may refer to:

United Kingdom
Alexander Anderson (Royal Marines officer) (1807–1877), Royal Marines general
Alexander Vass Anderson (1895–1963), British Army major general
Sir Charles Alexander Anderson (1857–1940), British Army lieutenant general
Sir Desmond Anderson (1885–1967), British Army lieutenant general
Sir Duncan Anderson (British Army officer) (1901–1980), British Army brigadier general
Sir Gilmour Anderson (1914–1977), British Army brigadier general
Sir Hastings Anderson (1872–1930), British Army lieutenant general
Sir Horace Searle Anderson (1833-1907), British Indian Army general
John Anderson (British Army officer) (1908–1988), British Army general
Sir John Evelyn Anderson (1916–2007), British Army major general
Sir Kenneth Anderson (British Army officer) (1891–1959), British Army general
Sir Richard Anderson (British Army officer) (1907–1979), British Army lieutenant general
Robert Charles Beckett Anderson (1895–1982), British Army brigadier general
Stuart Milligan Anderson, British brigadier general

United States

U.S. Army
Andy Anderson (general) (1913–2010), U.S. Army major general
Edward Anderson (American general, born 1864) (1864–1937), U.S. Army brigadier general
Edward D. Anderson (1868–1940), U.S. Army brigadier general
John B. Anderson (United States Army officer) (1891–1976), U.S. Army major general
Joseph Anderson (U.S. Army general) (born 1959), U.S. Army lieutenant general
LeRoy H. Anderson (1906–1991), U.S. Army Reserve major general
Marcia Anderson (born 1957), U.S. Army Reserve major general
Mark E. Anderson (fl. 1980s–2020s), U.S. Army National Guard major general
Thomas M. Anderson (1836–1917), U.S. Army brigadier general
Thurman Anderson (born 1932), U.S. Army major general
Robert Anderson (Civil War) (1805–1871), Union Army brigadier general

U.S. Air Force
Andrew B. Anderson Jr. (1926–2016), U.S. Air Force lieutenant general
Dagvin Anderson (fl. 1990s–2020s), U.S. Air Force major general
Edgar R. Anderson Jr. (born 1940), U.S. Air Force lieutenant general
Edward W. Anderson (1903–1979), U.S. Air Force major general
George K. Anderson (fl. 1970s–1990s), U.S. Air Force major general
Marcus A. Anderson (born 1939), U.S. Air Force major lieutenant general
Orvil A. Anderson (1895–1965), U.S. Air Force major general
Richard Dean Anderson, actor and honorary U.S. Air Force brigadier general
Samuel E. Anderson (1906–1982), U.S. Air Force general

Confederate States Army
Charles D. Anderson (1827–1901), Confederate States Army brigadier general
George B. Anderson (1831–1862), Confederate States Army brigadier general
George T. Anderson (1824–1901), Confederate States Army brigadier general
James Patton Anderson (1822–1872), Confederate States Army major general
Joseph R. Anderson (1813–1892), Confederate States Army brigadier general
Richard H. Anderson (general) (1821–1879), Confederate States Army lieutenant general
Robert H. Anderson (1835–1888), Confederate States Army brigadier general
Samuel Read Anderson (1804–1383), Confederate States Army brigadier general

Others
Earl E. Anderson (1919–2015), U.S. Marine Corps general
Joseph T. Anderson (born 1946), U.S. Marine Corps major general
Robert Anderson (Revolutionary War) (1741–1813), South Carolina Militia brigadier general

Other
A. T. Anderson (1886–1949), Australian Army brigadier general
Sir Robert Anderson (Australian general) (1865–1940), Australian Army brigadier
Thomas Victor Anderson (1881–1972), Canadian Army major general
Warren Melville Anderson (1894–1973), Australian Army major general
William Anderson (Canadian Army officer) (1915–2000), Canadian Army lieutenant general

See also
Anderson (surname)
Jan Andersson (Swedish Air Force officer) (born 1955), Swedish Air Force major general
General Andersen (disambiguation)
Attorney General Anderson (disambiguation)